Rosalie Norah King Gascoigne  (née Walker; 25 January 191725 October 1999) was a New Zealand-born Australian sculptor and assemblage artist. She showed at the Venice Biennale in 1982, becoming the first female artist to represent Australia there. In 1994, she was appointed a Member of the Order of Australia for her services to the arts.

Life
Gascoigne was born Rosalie Norah King Walker in Auckland, New Zealand, on 25 January 1917. She was the second of the three children of Stanley and Marion King Walker. She received her Bachelor of Arts degree from Auckland University College in 1937. She emigrated to Canberra, Australia in 1943 where she married astronomer S. C. B (Ben) Gascoigne whom she had met at Auckland University. They set up home in the isolated scientific community of Mount Stromlo. She was appointed a Member of the Order of Australia (AM) in June 1994, for services to art, particularly sculpture. She died on 25 October 1999 at the John James Hospital in Canberra.

Art
During the many lonely years spent raising her three children, Gascoigne found solace by making natural assemblages first via traditional flower arranging then later with the rigorous Japanese art form Sogetsu Ikebana. Her work in this medium was outstanding, earning praise from Japanese master and founder of the Sogetsu School of Ikebana, Sofu Teshigahara. Nevertheless, by the late 1960s, she had become dissatisfied with the limitations of the medium and started experimenting first with small scrap iron sculptures and later wooden boxed assemblages, all composed of materials she found while on scavenging expeditions in the fierce, sunburnt landscape of Australia. While the Australian landscape was initially a shocking change from the damp green hills of her familiar New Zealand, by this time, she had come to love the "boundless space and solitude" of her new home. Much of her art reflects this, though some also harks back to her roots in New Zealand.

Themes and influences
She said that her art-making materials "need to have been open to the weather." She thus used mostly found materials: wood, iron, wire, feathers, and yellow and orange retro-reflective road signs; which flash and glow in the light. Some of her other best-known works use faded, once-bright drinks crates; thinly-sliced yellow Schweppes boxes; ragged domestic items such as torn floral lino and patchy enamelware; vernacular building materials such as galvanised tin, corrugated iron and masonite; and fibrous, rosy cable reel ends. These objects represent, rather than accurately depict, elements of her world. "The countryside's discards .... no longer suggest themselves but evoke experiences, particularly of landscape."

Text is another important element of her work; she would cut up and rearrange the faded, naive lettering found on these items to create abstract yet evocative grids of letters and word fragments, sometimes alluding to the crosswords and poetry of which she was so fond. Knowledgeable and widely read, she was inspired amongst others by the artists Colin McCahon, Ken Whisson, Dick Watkins and Robert Rauschenberg, and the poets William Wordsworth, Peter Porter and Sylvia Plath. She also had a fondness for the pronouncements of Pablo Picasso. However gradually both colour and text seemed to fade from her work, and in her final years she created meditative, elegiac compositions of white or earth-brown panels.

Although working vigorously into her 80s, with occasional help from an assistant, her age at the height of her success precluded the travelling that would have been necessary to build the international audience her work deserved. Although she exhibited occasionally overseas—including the 1982 Venice Biennale (the first Australian woman to do so), Switzerland and Sweden as well as throughout Asia (Japan, South Korea, Taiwan amongst others), the major holdings of her work remain in Australia and New Zealand, both of which claim her as their own. Fine examples of Gascoigne's oeuvre can be found in most Antipodean galleries. The Metropolitan Museum of Art owns one of her smaller pieces.

Major collections

References

Further reading
The most comprehensive book on her work to date is Martin Gascoigne's "Rosalie Gascoigne: A catalogue raisonné", available to download for free at press.anu.edu.au. The most substantial exhibition catalogues are "From the Studio of Rosalie Gascoigne" containing memoirs and correspondence from her husband, son and studio assistants, and Kelly Gellatly's "Rosalie Gascoigne". The Australian Biography website has an extensive interview (video and text).

 Martin Gascoigne (2019) "Rosalie Gascoigne: A catalogue raisonné", ANU Press, Acton, ACT, Australia (print); ISBN (online): (online)
 Vici MacDonald (1998) "Rosalie Gascoigne", Regaro Press, Sydney 
 Mary Eagle, ed. (2000) From the Studio of Rosalie Gascoigne, Australian National University Drill Hall Gallery, exhibition catalogue. 
 www.australianbiography.gov.au › subjects › gascoigne › bio
 Mary Eagle (1985) "Rosalie Gascoigne New Work", https://eprints.utas.edu.au/18232/1/Rosalie_Gascoigne,_1985_Final.pdf
 Kelly Gellatly (2008) "Rosalie Gascoigne" National Gallery of Victoria, Melbourne (pbk)
 Gregory O'Brien (2004) Rosalie Gascoigne: Plain Air, City Gallery Wellington, Victoria University Press. 
 Deborah Edwards (1998) Rosalie Gascoigne: Material as Landscape, Art Gallery of New South Wales.

External links
  at 
Rosalie Gascoigne at the Art Gallery of New South Wales
Rosalie Gascoigne at Australian Biography
Rosalie Gascoigne at Roslyn Oxley9 Gallery
Lamp lit (1989), Queensland Art Gallery
Rosalie Gascoigne at the Museum of Contemporary Art Australia
Rosalie Gascoigne at the Museum of New Zealand Te Papa Tongarewa

1917 births
1999 deaths
20th-century Australian sculptors
New Zealand emigrants to Australia
Members of the Order of Australia
People associated with the Museum of New Zealand Te Papa Tongarewa
20th-century New Zealand women artists
Australian contemporary artists
20th-century Australian women artists
Australian women sculptors
University of Auckland alumni